Michael James Haight (born October 6, 1962) is a former American football offensive tackle in the National Football League for the New York Jets and Washington Redskins.  He played college football at the University of Iowa.  He played high school football at Beckman High School.

Haight was the first overall pick in the 1986 United States Football League draft by the Orlando Renegades. However, the league ceased operations soon thereafter and Haight never signed nor played with the team.

References

Iowa Hawkeyes football players
American football offensive linemen
New York Jets players
Washington Redskins players
People from Manchester, Iowa
Players of American football from Iowa
1962 births
Living people